Martin Codax or Codaz, Martín Codax or Martim Codax was a Galician medieval joglar (non-noble composer and performer, as opposed to a trobador), possibly from Vigo, Galicia in present-day Spain.  He may have been active during the middle of the thirteenth century, judging from scriptological analysis. He is one of only two out of a total of 88 authors of cantigas d'amigo who used only the archaic strophic form aaB (a rhymed distich followed by a refrain).  He employed an archaic rhyme-system whereby i~o / a~o were used in alternating strophes.  In addition Martin Codax consistently utilised a strict parallelistic technique known as leixa-pren (see the example below; the order of the third and fourth strophes is inverted in the Pergaminho Vindel but the correct order appears in the Cancioneiro da Biblioteca Nacional in Portugal, and the Cancioneiro da Vaticana). There is no documentary biographical information concerning the poet, dating the work at present remains based on theoretical analysis of the text.

Works in the Pergaminho Vindel 
The body of work attributed to him consists of seven cantigas d'amigo which appear in the Galician-Portuguese songbooks and in the Pergaminho Vindel (Vindel parchment). In all three manuscripts he is listed as the author of the compositions, in all three the number and order of the songs is the same. This provides what may be important evidence to support the view that the order of other poets' songs in the cancioneiros (songbooks) should not automatically be dismissed as random or attributed to later compilers.  The identification of authorship of the poems (and their order) may contribute to a viewpoint that the seven songs of Codax reflect an original performance set. Consequently, the sets of poems by other poets might also have been organized for performance.

The parchment was originally discovered by the Madrid-based antiquarian bookseller and bibliophile Pedro Vindel among his possessions in 1913; it had been used as the cover of a copy of Cicero's De Officiis.

Martim Codax's poems that appeared in the parchment are the following (originally untitled, they are listed by the first verse):

Ondas do mar de Vigo
Mandad'ey comigo
Mia irmana fremosa treydes comigo
Ay Deus, se sab'ora meu amigo
Quantas sabedes amar amigo
Eno sagrad' en Vigo
Ay ondas que eu vin veer

In the Pergaminho Vindel, musical notation (although with lacunae) survives along with the texts, except for the sixth one. They are the only cantigas d'amigo for which the music is known. The Pergaminho Sharrer contains seven melodies for cantigas d'amor of Denis of Portugal, also in fragmentary form.

A cantiga by Martin Codax 
Here is the third of his songs:

See also

Cantiga de amigo
Galician-Portuguese
Galician-Portuguese lyric
Pergaminho Sharrer

References

Bibliography 

Cunha, Celso. 1999. Cancioneiros dos Trovadores do Mar, edição preparada por Elsa Gonçalves. Lisboa: Imprensa Nacional/Casa de Moeda.
Ferreira, Manuel Pedro. 1986. O Som de Martin Codax. Sobre a dimensão musical da lírica galego-portuguesa (séculos XII–XIV). Lisbon:  UNISYS/ Imprensa Nacional – Casa de Moeda.
Ferreira, Manuel Pedro. 1998. “Codax Revisitado”, Anuario de Estudios Literarios Galegos: 157–68.
Marcenaro, Simone. 2015. "Nuove acquisizione sul Pergaminho Vinderl (New York Pierpont Morgan Library, ms. 979)". Critica del testo, 18:33–53.

Pena, Xosé Ramón. 1998. Xograres do mar de Vigo: Johán de Cangas, Martín Codax, Meendinho. Vigo: Edicións Xerais de Galicia. .
Pena, Xosé Ramón. 2013. Historia da literatura galega I: Das orixes a 1853. Vigo: Edicións Xerais de Galicia. .

External links
Portal de Martin Codax en la Biblioteca Virtual Miguel de Cervantes
 Digital edition
 Visualization

13th-century Galician-Portuguese troubadours